Brockagh (or Brocagh) is a village in County Tyrone, Northern Ireland. It lies within the Mid Ulster District Council area.

Features
The village consists mostly of single dwellings and farm buildings, although some in-depth development has recently taken place to the north of Mountjoy Road and to the west of Ballybeg Road. Land adjacent to the Duckingstool River may be subject to flooding.

Places of interest 

Mountjoy Castle is situated near the village of Brocagh, on a hill overlooking Lough Neagh. It was built by Lord Mountjoy in 1602 and partly burned in 1643.

People 
Venerable Mary Angeline Teresa

On 28 June 2012 Pope Benedict XVI authorized the Congregation for the Causes of Saints in Rome to promulgate the decree of Heroic Virtues of their Foundress, Mother Mary Angeline Teresa, O.Carm.

Brigid Teresa McCrory  was born on 21 January 1893 in Brockagh, Tyrone, Ireland. When she was seven years of age her family migrated to Bellshill Mossend, Scotland, and at the age of nineteen she left home to become a Little Sister of the Poor. In 1915 she was sent to the United States, and in the late 1920s founded the Carmelite Sisters for the Aged and Infirm. She opened 59 homes for the aged and died on 21 January 1984, her birthday.

Education 
St. Brigid's Primary School, Brocagh

Sport
Naomh Bríd Brocagh Camogie association club is also based in the village

See also 
List of villages in Northern Ireland
List of towns in Northern Ireland

External links
St. Brigid's Primary School, Brocagh

References 

Villages in County Tyrone